Fontenelle is a census-designated place (CDP) in Lincoln County, Wyoming, United States. The population was 13 at the 2010 census.

Geography
Fontenelle is located at  (41.990006, −110.053420).

According to the United States Census Bureau, the CDP has a total area of 3.6 square miles (9.3 km2), of which 3.5 square miles (8.9 km2) is land and 0.1 square mile (0.4 km2) (3.90%) is water.

Demographics
As of the census of 2000, there were 19 people, 5 households, and 5 families residing in the CDP. The population density was 5.5 people per square mile (2.1/km2). There were 8 housing units at an average density of 2.3/sq mi (0.9/km2). The racial makeup of the CDP was 100.00% White.

There were 5 households, out of which 80.0% had children under the age of 18 living with them, 100.0% were married couples living together, and 0.0% were non-families. No households were made up of individuals, and none had someone living alone who was 65 years of age or older. The average household size was 3.80 and the average family size was 3.80.

In the CDP, the population was spread out, with 42.1% under the age of 18, 5.3% from 18 to 24, 31.6% from 25 to 44, and 21.1% from 45 to 64. The median age was 30 years. For every 100 females, there were 72.7 males. For every 100 females age 18 and over, there were 83.3 males.

The median income for a household in the CDP was $0, and the median income for a family was $0. Males had a median income of $0 versus $0 for females. The per capita income for the CDP was $0. There are 100.0% of families living below the poverty line and 100.0% of the population, including no under eighteens and none of those over 64.

Climate

According to the Köppen Climate Classification system, Fontenelle has a cold semi-arid climate, abbreviated "BSk" on climate maps.

References

Census-designated places in Wyoming
Census-designated places in Lincoln County, Wyoming